Marie-Louise Mumbu, also called Bibish, is a Congolese journalist born on 15 September 1975.

Mumbu works for Africultures, Le Potentiel, L’Observateur, and The Post. Mumbu lives in Kinshasa and Montreal.

Mumbu is the writer of the memoir Samantha à Kinshasa: Autobiographie, Carnet De La Création, on the Congolese visual artist Francis Mapuya, and Mes Obsessions: j’y pense et puis je crie!

References

Living people
Democratic Republic of the Congo women journalists
Democratic Republic of the Congo journalists
1975 births
21st-century journalists
21st-century memoirists
Democratic Republic of the Congo women writers
Women memoirists
21st-century non-fiction writers
21st-century Egyptian women writers
21st-century Egyptian writers
21st-century Democratic Republic of the Congo people